Flat Creek is a  long 1st order tributary to Stewarts Creek in Carroll County, Virginia.

Course 
Flat Creek rises about 0.5 miles west of Sams Knob in Carroll County and then flows east to join Stewarts Creek about 0.25 miles southwest of Lambsburg, Virginia.

Watershed 
Flat Creek drains  of area, receives about 52.9 in/year of precipitation, has a wetness index of 283.63, and is about 84% forested.

See also 
 List of Rivers of Virginia

References 

Rivers of Carroll County, Virginia
Rivers of Virginia